Dishum TV is an Indian, Bhojpuri general entertainment free to air (FTA) television channel owned and operated by Dishum Broadcasting Pvt Ltd.  An entertainment company based in Mumbai, Maharashtra, the channel airs content intended for people of all ages ranging from drama, daily soap, films, devotional songs, mythological shows, music, and shows featuring Bollywood celebrities.

The Dishum channel is available on INSAT4A (83Deg. East) Downlink Frequency:4133 MhzPolarity: HorizontalSymbol Rate:11.888Audio PID:81Video PID:82.

Programming 

Ghayal Khiladi
440 Volt
Ghar Pahucha Da Devi Maiya 
Kesariya Balam Aavo Hamare Des
Ganesh Leela
Kahani Chandrakanta Ki
Woh Rehne Waali Mehlon Ki
Jaga Sadhu Bhor Bhayil
Bhajie Prabhu Ka Naam 
Draupadi
Prem Leela
Mai ke Mahima
Jai Maa Aadi Shakti
Ghare Ayili Saton Bahiniya
Dance Ka Tadka
Kismat Connection

List of Movies

Ashok (2006)
Saugandh (2006 film)
Maiya Rakhiha Senurwa Aabad (2006)
Ek Jwalamukhi (2007)
Main Hoon King (2008)
Tohare Karan Gail Bhainsiya Paani Mein (2009)
Pariwar (2009 film)
Maar Deb Goli Kehu Na Boli (2010)
Najariya Tohse Lagi (2010)
Pyar Karela Himmat Chahi (2011)
Jab Kehu Dil Mein Sama Jala (2012)
Kaalia (2013 film) 
Panchayat (2013 film) (2013)
Chutki Bhar Sindoor (2013)
Mamta Ka Karz (2013)
Veer Balwan (2013)
Jaan Lebu Ka Ho (2014)
Ek Laila Teen Chhaila (2014)
Rowdy Rani (2014)
Maine Dil Tujko Diya (2014 film)
Adalat (2014 film)
Hathkadi (2014 film)
Bihari Rikshawala
Khaki Vardiwala (2015)
Ishqbaaz (2015 film) 
Kajra Mohabbat Wala (2015)
Maai Ke Karz (2015)
Muqabla (2016 film)
Baliya Ke Dabangai (2016)
Love Aur Rajneeti (2016)
Dulha Hindustani (2017)
Jitab Hum Pyar Ke Baazi (2017)
Maai Ke Ancharwa Babuji Ke Dulaar (2017)
Mukhtar (2017 film)
Chana Jor Garam (2018 film)
Mohabbat Ki Saughat (2018)
Love Ke Liye Kuchh Bhi Karenge (2018)

See also
List of Bhojpuri-language television channels

References

Television stations in India
Television stations in New Delhi
Satellite television
Television channels and stations established in 2017